R v Plant, [1993] 3 S.C.R. 281 is a leading decision of the Supreme Court of Canada on the protection of personal information under the Canadian Charter of Rights and Freedoms. The issue was whether the warrantless perimeter search of the accused home and the seizure of electricity consumption records violated the accused's right against unreasonable search and seizure under section 8 of the Charter. The Court held that the seizure of consumption records was not in violation of section 8, but that the perimeter search did violate the Charter.

See also
 List of Supreme Court of Canada cases (Lamer Court)

References

External links
 

Section Eight Charter case law
Supreme Court of Canada cases
1993 in Canadian case law
Supreme Court of Canada case articles without infoboxes